Amay Gyan (born Ma Chan-Tha) is a prominent Burmese nat (spiritual being). She is one of the five mother nats of Burma. The festival of Amay Gyan is held each year on the 13th and 14th waning days of the month of Nayon of the Burmese calendar (May or June), in Ayegyigon, Mandalay Region.

Legend
Amay Gyan was born Chan-Tha to the chief of the Shwedaung village in present-day central Myanmar  mid-14th century. She was reportedly disowned by her family for marrying Nga Tet Pya, whom her father deemed a dubious character and a drunkard. After the marriage, she too became addicted to toddy palm wine like her husband. One day, a drunken Chan-Tha got into an argument with the guards at one of the gates of Ava, the capital. The argument quickly escalated into a physical altercation after she started cursing out at the guards. She was severely beaten up by the guards, and died from the injuries. For her courage, she became a martyr to the local populace, and later entered the pantheon of Burmese nats (spirits) as a nat named Amay Gyan ("Mother Gyan").

References

Burmese nats
Burmese goddesses